Frequent Communion is the Roman Catholic practice of receiving the Eucharist frequently, as opposed to the usual medieval practice of receiving it once or a few times a year, by going to mass on Sundays.  Pope Pius X pushed for the practice of frequent communion, relaxing restrictions on reception for the sick and children.

Regarding weekly versus daily communion, St. Francis de Sales encouraged weekly communion, but he neither encouraged nor discouraged daily communion.

References

Bibliography 
Antoine Arnauld, De la fréquente communion (1643)

Eucharist in the Catholic Church